Octav Pancu-Iași (14 April 1929 – 16 April 1975) was a leading Romanian novelist and children's writer. Born Octav Pancu, he later added the name of his hometown to his surname.

Biography
The son of Basil Pancu, a civil servant, he attended schools in Iași and Bucharest. He worked as an editor for Romanian Radio (1947–58), in film (1959–62) and with the Cutezatorii magazine (1967–69). His writing career started in 1949 with a volume of poetry Timpul sta pe loc? (Does Time Stand Still?). He published two novels:  (The Sea Battle of the Little Pond, 1953) and Cartea cu ochi albastri (Book with Blue Eyes, 1959) and wrote many stories for children. He also wrote the screenplays Vara romantică (Romantic Summer, 1961), Tată de duminică (Sunday Father, 1975) and Singurătatea florilor (Flowers of Loneliness, 1976).

Pancu-Iași's works have been translated into several languages, especially German and Czech but not English. The literary magazine Observator Cultural listed  him as one of the leading writers of children's literature in Romania, among others such as Dumitru Almaș, Călin Gruia, Gica Iuteș, Mircea Sântimbreanu and Ovidiu Zotta.

He died of a heart attack in Bucharest when he was only 46.

Selected works
Octav Pancu-Iași's principal works in Romanian are listed below. A complete list of publications including all translations is available from the European Library.

1949: , poetry
1951: 
1951: 
1952: 
1953: , novel
1956: , children's stories
1956: 
1957:  (dramatized in 1959)
1958: 
1959: , novel
1960: 
1963: 
1964: 
1967: 
1968: 
1970: , children's stories
1972: 
1972: 
1977:

References

Writers from Bucharest
1929 births
1975 deaths